Kim Jin-tae is a South Korean actor, best known for playing as Yeon Gaesomun in Dae Jo Yeong.

Filmography
Post of Love (2022) - grandpa 
House of the Rising Sun (1980)
One Night in an Unfamiliar Place (1980)
The Single Woman (1979)
Rainy Day in Autumn (1979)
The Story of Yellow Village (1979)
12 Boarders (1979)
Sorrow for the Stars (1978)
The Gate  (1978)
Our Highschool Days (1978)
Once Upon a Time (1978)
Tomboys of School (1977)
March of a Joker  (1977)
Tall Boy and Short Boy (1977)

Awards

2006 KBS Drama Awards, Excellence Award, Actor (for playing as Yeon Gaesomun in Dae Jo Yeong)

References 

Living people
South Korean male television actors
South Korean male film actors
Year of birth missing (living people)